EICC may refer to:

 Eastern Iowa Community Colleges
 Edinburgh International Conference Centre
 East India Cliff Company
 Electronic Industry Citizenship Coalition
 English for International Conferences and Communication